USS Chimariko (ATF-154) was an Abnaki class Fleet Ocean Tug of the United States Navy and the first to be named Chimariko after the Native American tribe in California.

She was laid down as (AT-154) at Charleston Shipbuilding and Dry Dock Co., Charleston S.C.

On 15 May 1944 she was redesignated Fleet Ocean Tug (ATF-149).  She was launched on 30 December 1944 (Sponsored by Mrs. G. Davis) and commissioned USS Chimariko (ATF-154) on 28 April 1945. Departing Norfolk, Va.

World War II

5 June 1945; Chimariko reached Galveston, Texas
12 to 16 June; Towed the disabled tanker SS C. A. Canfield from Sabine Pass
16 June to 1 July; She towed a floating drydock YFD-3 to Cristobal, C.Z.
9 July; Passing through the Panama Canal she towed YFs 727 and 1069 via San Diego to Kwajalein, in the Marshall Islands arriving 25 August
1 September; She departed for San Pedro Bay, Leyte, P.I., arriving 19 September

Post war

17 October 1945; The Chimariko reported at Okinawa for salvage duty
14 January 1946; She towed the concrete barge  to Hong Kong, weathering a severe storm in the straits south of Formosa to arrive safely 19 January.
18 February 1946; Chimariko departed Hong Kong and, after brief periods of salvage and towing duty at Subic Bay, P.I. and Guam, she steamed via Pearl Harbor to San Pedro, Calif., arriving 9 June to be placed out of commission and placed in the Pacific Reserve Fleet 31 October 1946.

Final Disposition

Chimariko was transferred to Maritime Administration custody in 1962, but was returned to the Navy in August 1976 for use as a salvage training hulk. Later employed as a target, she was sunk in deep water off Southern California on 27 August 1978.

She now lies at rest in 1150 fathoms at 032,00 N, 118,00 W.

External links
DANFS: Online Library of Selected Images: U.S. NAVY SHIPS USS Chimariko (ATF-154), 1945-1978
NavSource Online: Service Ship Photo Archive AT-154 / ATF-154 Chimariko

 

Abnaki-class tugs
1944 ships
Ships built in Charleston, South Carolina